Bhoke railway station is a station on Konkan Railway. It is at a distance of  down from origin at the north side ie; Roha railway station which is end of jurisdiction of Central Railway zone of Indian railways.. The preceding station on the line is Ukshi railway station and the next station is Ratnagiri railway station. There is a 6.5 kilometre-long tunnel known as Karbude Tunnel located on the Konkan Railway situated between UKSHI and Bhoke station. Karbude Tunnel is Konkan railway line's longest tunnel. Karbude Tunnel remained India's longest rail tunnel until the Indian Government gave green light to the railways to plan and construct Pir Panjal Railway Tunnel.  The Bhoke railway station on Konkan railway track(line) lies between two railway tunnels.

The only trains that halt here are the Diva Sawantwadi Passenger and Diva Ratnagiri Passenger.

References

Railway stations along Konkan Railway line
Railway stations in Ratnagiri district
Railway stations opened in 1997
Ratnagiri railway division